Antoinette Robertson is an American actress, known for her roles in the Oprah Winfrey Network prime time soap opera, The Haves and the Have Nots (2014–18), and Netflix comedy-drama series Dear White People (2017–2021).

Life and career
Robertson began her acting career in William Esper Studio. Her first notable role was in the CW comedy-drama series Hart of Dixie (2013–14). In 2014, she was cast in a recurring role in the Oprah Winfrey Network prime time soap opera, The Haves and the Have Nots playing the role of Melissa Wilson. She was promoted to series regular in season five, her final season on show.

In 2017, Robertson was cast as Colandrea 'Coco' Conners in the Netflix comedy-drama series, Dear White People. The series ended in 2021. In 2021, she had a recurring role in the Canadian drama series, Diggstown.

Filmography

Film

Television

Awards and nominations

References

External links
Official website

African-American actresses
American people of Jamaican descent
21st-century American actresses
American television actresses
Living people
Actresses from New York City
21st-century African-American women
21st-century African-American people
1993 births